Stewart Kellerman (born Dec. 13, 1941) is an American author, journalist, and blogger who has reported on wars in Asia, Latin America, and the Middle East. A former editor at The New York Times and foreign correspondent for United Press International, he has covered conflicts in Vietnam, Cambodia, Laos, Bangladesh,
 Argentina, Uruguay, Israel, 
and the Arab world.

Kellerman earned a bachelor's degree from Columbia University in 1964 and was the 1972–73 Edward R. Murrow Press Fellow at the Council on Foreign Relations, where he focused on American policy with China and the Soviet Union. During his career with UPI, he wrote feature stories from the battle zones in addition to news dispatches. A feature written on Christmas Eve 1971, about a party for the children of South Vietnamese soldiers, became the foreword to Alan Dawson's book 55 Days: The Fall of South Vietnam (1977).

He has also written a comic novel about growing old in America, and has co-authored books and articles about the English language with his wife, the language commentator Patricia T. O'Conner. He has written book reviews and articles on cultural subjects for the Times. He and O'Conner write about language on The Grammarphobia Blog, where they have answered nearly 4,000 questions from readers since 2006.

Publications

Books 
 Swan Song: A Novel (Rushwater Press, 2019).  
 Origins of the Specious: Myths and Misconceptions of the English Language, co-authored by O'Conner (Random House, 2010).  
 You Send Me: Getting It Right When You Write Online, co-authored by O'Conner (Harcourt, 2002). 
 55 Days: The Fall of South Vietnam, by Alan Dawson. Foreword by Stewart Kellerman. (Prentice-Hall, 1977.)

References 

War correspondents of the Vietnam War
American foreign correspondents
20th-century American journalists
The New York Times editors
21st-century American non-fiction writers
21st-century American novelists
Writers of style guides
Journalists from New York City
Linguistics writers
Columbia University alumni
Year of birth missing (living people)

Living people